Dmytro Vitaliyovych Klyots (born 15 April 1996) is a Ukrainian professional footballer who plays as a central midfielder for Veres Rivne.

Career
Klyots is the product of the Veres Rivne and UFK Lviv School Systems. His first trainers in UFK were Roman Hnativ and Vitaliy Lobasyuk.

He made his debut for FC Karpaty in a game against FC Metalurh Donetsk on 1 March 2015 in Ukrainian Premier League.

On 7 August 2020, Klyots signed a contract with Keşla FK until the end of the 2020–21 season. On 29 August 2021 he scored against Desna Chernihiv in Ukrainian Premier League in the season 2021–22 at the Stadion Yuri Gagarin.

International
He has also played for different Ukrainian youth national football teams.

References

External links
 
 

1996 births
Living people
Sportspeople from Rivne
Ukrainian footballers
Ukraine youth international footballers
FC Karpaty Lviv players
Shamakhi FK players
Sabah FC (Azerbaijan) players
NK Veres Rivne players
Ukrainian Premier League players
Azerbaijan Premier League players
Ukrainian expatriate footballers
Expatriate footballers in Azerbaijan
Ukrainian expatriate sportspeople in Azerbaijan
Association football midfielders